The hochepot is a sort of stew much appreciated in the Nord-Pas-de-Calais region of France, and in Flanders and Hainaut in Belgium. Its origins go back to the Middle Ages and its first known recipes are in the Manuscript of Sion, the oldest treatise of cooking written in French around the 13th century. Although almost the same word is used in both Dutch and French, it has nothing to do with Dutch hutspot which is a dish made from mashed potato and whose recipe is said to have been concocted during the siege of Leiden in 1574.

Definition
It is a Flemish stew made with oxtail, shoulder of mutton, salted bacon, and vegetables. The stewed vegetables are served whole, unlike the Dutch hutspot, in which they are served mashed.

The hochepot was formerly a meal with meat, chestnuts and turnips cooked with stock in a clay pot. Nowadays, it is cooked with different kinds of meat: beef ribs, shoulder or neck of mutton, veal chest or veal collar, salted pork, pig's ears and pig's trotter and sausages. They simmer in a pot with winter vegetables: carrots, parsnips, onions, leeks, celery, potatoes and herbs.

Origin and etymology 
It is an old recipe from the north of France and the emblematic dish of Flanders and the province of Hainaut. The etymology of the word comes from the old French ""hottison" which mean "shake" in English. The term also refers to a pot roast chicken with vegetables cooked with down pieces of beef.

Historical background
The oldest treatise of cooking in French is the Manuscript of Sion. It was written at the end of the 13th century. It was found in the Cantonal Library of Valais. It gives a recipe that says how to accommodate boar and deer meat which must be "Long boiled, larded lengthwise from within. Then cook in new water with mace and a lot of wine. Add a cameline sauce".

If no vegetable to go with the dish is mentioned in the manuscript, it is not the same for the salted meat. To accommodate it, he advises: "Soak. Then wash very well. Throw out the first broth. Wash with clean water. Let cool. Then cut into thin slices. Bring to a boil with half water and half white wine. Then peel the chestnuts cooked on the coals. Place everything on a plate. Serve the game meat with the broth. Eat with some mustard ".

This kind of preparation is very close to the hochepot recipe of a manuscript of Ghent University Library dated to the late 15th or early 16th century. This recipe of hochepot with venison is called "Om hutspot te redenen van een hert". It looks like the medieval stew which contains onions and red wine. It is reported that besides venison, onions and red wine, you need verjuice, butter, sugar, nutmeg and cardamom. The hochepot was then just a kind of meat cooked in a liquid. It is the only similarity that allows to connect the medieval hochepots with the current Flemish hochepots.

Le Viandier de Taillevent, the oldest manuscript of which was written in the 14th century, possesses only one hochepot recipe, with poultry. The oldest version remains the one in the Manuscript of Sion. This reads: "Hochepot de poullaile metez par membres surfrire en saing de lart prenez ung pou de pain brullé & des foyes deffais de vin & du boillon de beuf metez boulir vostre grain affinez gingembre canelle grene de paradis deffait de verjus et doit estre noiret & cler".

Its modern editor affirms that "the different versions of the Viandier are rewritings and enlargements of the original version of the manuscript of Sion, prior to the presumed birth of Taillevent".

The recipe for hochepot has changed with time and this recipe is quite unlike the hochepot recipe from Ghent. In the manuscript of Sion, it is a stew with "pieces of poultry fried with bacon. It is cooked then in a broth and thickened with some liver and toast. It is spiced with cinnamon and maniguette and then mixed with some verjuice to give it a clear appearance."

The hochepot in the Middle Ages and its wide diversity of recipes do not make it possible to give a more precise definition except to say that it is the ancestor of the current hochepot.

Food / beer / wine pairings 
Traditionally in the Nord-Pas-de-Calais region, this dish is accompanied by a lager or a fresh, young, white wine .

See also
 List of stews
 Coddle

References

French stews
Belgian cuisine
Medieval cuisine